This is a list of compositions by William Sterndale Bennett.

Piano

Piano Solo
Capriccio, Op 2
Three Musical Sketches, Op 10
Six Studies, Op 11
Three Impromptus, Op 12
Sonata No. 1, Op 13
Three Romances, Op 14
Fantasia, Op 16
Three Diversions, as duets, Op 17
Allegro Grazioso, Op 18
Suite de Pièces, Op 24
Rondo piacevole, Op. 25
Scherzo, Op. 27
Introductione e pastorale, Rondino, Capriccio Op 28
Two Characteristic Studies, Op 29
Tema e Variazione, Op 31
30 Preludes and Lessons, Op. 33
Rondo Pas Triste, pas gai, Op 34
January and February, Op 36
Rondeau a la polonaise, Op 37
Toccata Op 38
Sonata No 2, The Maid of Orleans, Op. 46

Chamber music

Cello and Piano
Sonata Duo for Cello and Piano, Op 32

Piano Trio
Chamber Piano Trio in A major, Op. 26

Other
String Quartet in G major (1831)
Piano Sextet in F sharp minor, Op 8

Orchestral

Symphonies
Symphony No. 1 in E-flat major (completed 6 April 1832)
Symphony No. 2 in D minor (1832-33)
Symphony No. 4 in A minor (1833-1834) 
Symphony No. 5 in G minor (1835-36)
Symphony in G minor, Op 43

Overtures
Parisina, Op 3
The Naiades, Op 15
Die Waldnymphe, Op 20
Paradise and the Peri, Op 42

Piano and Orchestra
Piano Concerto No. 1 in D minor, Op 1
Piano Concerto No. 2 in E-flat, Op 4
Piano Concerto No. 3 in C minor, Op 9
Piano Concerto No. 4 in F minor, Op 19 (1838)
Piano Concerto No. 5 in F minor
Piano Concerto No. 6 in A minor
Caprice for Piano and Orchestra, Op 22
Adagio for Piano and Orchestra

Choral Music
Pastoral: The May Queen, Op 39
Sacred Cantata: The Woman of Samaria, Op 44 (Birmingham Festival, 1867)
Duet: Remember Now Thy Creator
Exhibition Ode (1862), Op 40
Cambridge Installation Ode, Op 41
Now, my God, Let, I beseech Thee
God is a Spirit
Several other anthems, Hymn and Psalm tunes

Songs
Six Songs: first set, Op 23
Six Songs: second set, Op 35
Maiden Mine Op 47
Part song: Come Live With Me

External links
List of compositions (in German) 

References 

Notes

Bennett, William Sterndale
Bennett, List Of compositions By William Sterndale